Crofton Locks are a flight of locks on the Kennet and Avon Canal, near the village of Great Bedwyn, Wiltshire, England.

The nine locks achieve a total rise/fall of 61 ft 0 in (18.5 m) and were built under the supervision of engineer John Rennie.

West of the top lock is the summit of the canal at 450 ft (137 m) above sea level. Lockage water is taken from Wilton Water to the summit at the western end of the locks by electric pumps and, on occasion, by the restored Crofton Pumping Station.

Location
Although named for Crofton in the civil parish of Great Bedwyn the locks are actually situated in the parish of Grafton, as the parish boundary at this point is the West of England Main Line to the north of the canal.

References

See also

Locks on the Kennet and Avon Canal

Locks on the Kennet and Avon Canal
Canals in Wiltshire
Hills of Wiltshire